Events from the year 1560 in Sweden

Incumbents
 Monarch – Gustav I then Eric XIV

Events

 April - Duke John return home from England with a negative reply to the proposal of Crown Prince Eric to Elizabeth I of England.
 1 July - The dying king makes his formally farewell to the public. 
 29 September - Gustav I dies and are succeeded by Eric XIV.
 - Arch Bishop Laurentius Petri bans priests from baptizing or burying romani.

Births

 - Lucretia Gyllenhielm, illegitimate royal daughter  (died 1585) 
 13–14 June - Constantia Eriksdotter, illegitimate royal daughter  (died 1649) 
 - Amalia von Hatzfeld, county governor  (died 1628)

Deaths

 29 September - Gustav I, monarch  (born 1496). After having suffered from declining health throughout the 1550s, Gustav ultimately died on September 29, 1560, at Tre Kronor castle, Stockholm. Gustav is renowned as the founder of modern Sweden.

References

 
Years of the 16th century in Sweden
Sweden